Evans Creek may refer to:

Evans Creek (Peters Creek), a stream in California
Evans Creek (Tuscarawas River), a stream in Ohio
Evans Creek (Rogue River tributary), a stream in Oregon
Evans Creek (Devils River), a stream in Texas
Evans Creek (Lake Erie), a watershed administered by the Long Point Region Conservation Authority, that drains into Lake Erie

See also
Evans River